Eliad may refer to:

Places 
 Eliad, Golan Heights, an Israeli settlement in the Golan Heights

Persons

Given names
Eliad Cohen (born 1988), Israeli producer, actor, model, entrepreneur 
 Eliad Moreh, Iraqi-French, later Israeli terror survivor
Eliad Nachum (born 1990), Israeli singer and actor

Family names 
 Nissim Eliad, born N. Amsalem; 1919-2014), Israeli politician

Others
Ion Heliade Rădulescu (pen name is I. Eliad)

See also 
 Eliade (surname)
 Heliades, daughters of Helios
 Iliad

Hebrew-language given names
Jewish given names
Hebrew-language surnames
Jewish surnames